Jeremy Booker (born November 8, 1986) is a Canadian former ice sledge hockey player. He won a gold medal with Team Canada at the 2006 Winter Paralympics. He also played in the 2010 Winter Paralympics.

References

1986 births
Living people
Paralympic sledge hockey players of Canada
Canadian sledge hockey players
Paralympic gold medalists for Canada
People from Ajax, Ontario
Sportspeople from Ontario
Paralympic silver medalists for Canada
Medalists at the 2006 Winter Paralympics
Paralympic medalists in sledge hockey
Ice sledge hockey players at the 2006 Winter Paralympics